Dan Fesperman (born September 15, 1955, in Charlotte, North Carolina) is a former reporter for The Baltimore Sun and the author of several thrillers. The plots were inspired by the author's own international assignments in Germany, Bosnia, Afghanistan, Pakistan and the Middle East. He is a 1977 graduate of the University of North Carolina and lives in Baltimore, Maryland with his wife Liz Bowie, a reporter for The Baltimore Sun, and their two children.

List of works 
 Lie in the Dark, No Exit Press, 1999, 
 The Small Boat of Great Sorrows, Black Swan, 2003, 
 The Warlord's Son, Black Swan, 2004, 
 The Prisoner of Guantanamo, Hodder & Stoughton, 2006, 
 The Amateur Spy, Hodder & Stoughton, 2007, 
 The Arms Maker of Berlin, Hodder & Stoughton, 2009, 
 Layover in Dubai, Knopf, 2010, 
 The Double Game, Knopf, 2012, 
 Unmanned, Knopf, 2014, 
 The Letter Writer, Knopf, 2016, 
 Safe Houses, Knopf, 2018, 
 The Cover Wife, Knopf, 2021, 
 Winter Work, Knopf, 2022,

Awards 
 1999 The John Creasey Memorial Dagger Award for best first novel
 2003 The Ian Fleming Steel Dagger for best thriller
 2006 The Hammett Prize

References

External links 
 Official Website

20th-century American novelists
21st-century American novelists
American male novelists
American thriller writers
Living people
1955 births
20th-century American male writers
21st-century American male writers
Barry Award winners